The 2005 New Zealand Warriors season was the 11th in the club's history. The club competed in Australasia's National Rugby League. The coach of the team was Tony Kemp while Steve Price was the club captain.

Milestones
3 April - Round 4: Clinton Toopi played in his 100th match for the club.
9 April - Round 5: Francis Meli plays in his 100th first grade match for the club.
7 May - Round 9: Wairangi Koopu played in his 100th match for the club.
13 August - Round 23: Monty Betham played in his 100th first grade match for the club and Karl Temata played in his 50th game for the club.

Jersey & Sponsors

Fixtures

The Warriors used Ericsson Stadium as their home ground in 2005, their only home ground since they entered the competition in 1995.

Pre-season

The Warriors played a match against the NZRL's Presidents selection at North Harbour Stadium on 27 February. The President's selection was coached by John Ackland and Tawera Nikau and included: Toshio Laiseni, Cooper Vuna, Simon Mannering, Joshua Davis, Rowan Baxter, Daniel Vasau, Bernard Perenara, George Tuakura, Ben Lythe, Phil Shead, Odell Manuel, Chris Newton, Wayne McDade. Interchange: Paul Atkins, Andreas Bauer, Marvin Filipo, Robinson Godfrey, Pinomi Tafea, Willie Live, Artie Shead, Sam Rapira, Chris Tupou, Dean Shepherd, Antonio Tusani. For the Warriors, the match was Nathan Fien's first for the club. The Warriors won the game 58–6.

Regular season

Ladder

Squad

Twenty Four players were used by the Warriors in 2005, including several players who made their first grade debuts.

Staff
Chief Executive Officer: Mick Watson

Coaching Staff
Head coach: Tony Kemp
Assistant coach: Ivan Cleary
Assistant coach: Kevin Campion
IT and Video Analyst: Tony Iro
Trainer: Craig Walker

Transfers

Gains

Losses

Other Teams
Players not required by the Warriors were released to play in the 2005 Bartercard Cup. This included Cooper Vuna who played for the Otahuhu-Ellerslie Leopards.

Awards
Ruben Wiki won the Player of the Year award.

References

External links
Warriors official site
2005 Warriors Season at rugbyleagueproject.org

New Zealand Warriors seasons
New Zealand Warriors season
War